Dean Taylor is an American indie rock guitarist.

The Brian Jonestown Massacre
Taylor is most notable for his work with the neo-psychedelic rock band, The Brian Jonestown Massacre. He was an original member and contributed as a guitarist throughout the band's early career.

Taylor was featured in the Ondi Timoner documentary movie DiG!. Dean Taylor, along with Joel Gion, Matt Hollywood, Dave Deresinski and Miranda Lee Richards provide additional commentary on disc one of the DVD DiG!. Taylor later left the project permanently in 1999.

The Mandarins/Tokyo Raid
Taylor contributed to the San Francisco-based indie/shoegaze/neo-psychedelic rock band, The Mandarins. The group was formed in early November, 2004 by guitarist Ben Utah. Taylor was active with the band in 2006-2007. In 2008, the band changed its name to Tokyo Raid.

Personal life
Taylor married Sherilyn Monroe in 2014.

Discography

with The BJM
 Their Satanic Majesties' Second Request (1996) Bomp! Records/Tangible
 Take It From The Man! (1996) Bomp! Records/Tangible
 Thank God For Mental Illness (1996) Bomp! Records/Tangible
 Strung Out in Heaven (1998) TVT Records

with The Mandarins/Tokyo Raid
 When The Devil Calls, Tell Him To Take A Number (EP) (2005)
 Cleopatra (EP) (2007)

External links
 Profile of Dean Taylor on MySpace (additional images)
 Official Tokyo Raid Website
 Official Brian Jonestown Massacre Website

Year of birth missing (living people)
Living people
American rock guitarists
American male guitarists
American indie rock musicians
The Brian Jonestown Massacre members